N-Phenethyl-4-piperidinone (NPP) is a derivative of 4-piperidinone with the molecular formula C13H17NO. It is used as an intermediate in the manufacture of chemicals and pharmaceutical drugs such as fentanyl. 

Because of its possible use in the illicit manufacture of fentanyl, NPP was placed under control as a List 1 Chemical in 2007. Both domestic sales and domestic importations are thus subject to DEA reporting requirements.

Preparation
N-Phenethyl-4-piperidinone can be prepared from 4-piperidinone and phenethyl bromide in biphasic conditions with a variety of phase transfer catalysts.

Uses
N-Phenethyl-4-piperidinone is useful in the synthesis of pharmaceuticals, primarily fentanyl and its analogs. Paul Janssen (founder of Janssen Pharmaceutica) first synthesized fentanyl in 1960 from Benzylfentanyl.  The Seigfried method (shown below and published on The Hive) involves reacting N-phenethyl-4-piperidinone with aniline, and then reducing the imine product with sodium borohydride to 4-anilino-N-phenethylpiperidine (ANPP). This product is reacted with propionyl chloride to form fentanyl.

References

Further reading 

 

Ketones
Piperidines
Phenethylamines
Janssen Pharmaceutica